SalesforceIQ (formerly RelateIQ), a subsidiary of Salesforce.com, was an American software company based in Palo Alto, California. The company's software involved a relationship intelligence platform that combines data from email systems, smartphone calls, and appointments to augment or replace standard relationship management tools or database solutions. It scanned "about 10,000 emails, calendar entries, and other data points per minute at first run".

Acquired by salesforce.com in 2014 for close to $400 million, the company's product was retired in 2020.

Technology 
Unlike traditional relationship management systems, which rely on data input by users to keep their teams informed and run predictive analytics, SalesforceIQ's platform automatically isolates and analyzes a user's professional emails and other interactions. In combining this data with information gleaned from other sources, such as LinkedIn and Facebook, SalesforceIQ leverages data science "to comb through emails, analyze them, and offer reminders and suggestions to busy salespeople."

In March 2014, the company released "Closest Connections", a feature that "automates a normally time-consuming—and potentially erroneous—sales process" by identifying warm introductions for potential prospects based on real activity happening within a team's email inboxes, phones, calendars, and social networks.

History
The company was founded in July 2011 by Adam Evans and Steve Loughlin. At the end of July 2013, the company hired data scientist DJ Patil as VP of Product.

As part of the 2015 Dreamforce conference, RelateIQ was rebranded as SalesforceIQ.

On March 13, 2020, the SalesforceIQ product was retired.

References

Salesforce
Big data companies
Data management software
Enterprise software
Business software
Software companies based in the San Francisco Bay Area
Software companies established in 2011
2011 establishments in California
Companies based in Palo Alto, California
Defunct software companies of the United States